The National Guard of Bahrain is separate military force from the Bahrain Defence Force. The National Guard is charged with internal security and assisting the Bahrain Defence Force in defending against external threats. It was established in 1997, through a royal decree by then Emir Isa bin Salman Al Khalifa.

The National Guard is currently commanded by General Mohammed bin Isa Al Khalifa, brother of King Hamad bin Isa Al Khalifa. It consists of about 3,800 personnel.

The National Guard has been involved in the Bahrain government's successful attempt at restoring order and peace after violent protesters wreaked havoc during the Bahraini uprising of 2011.

Heavy Armour and Armoured combat vehicle

Air force

References

1997 establishments in Bahrain
National Guard